The Caribbean island of Barbados has a small, albeit growing network of diplomatic and consular missions. As a member-state of the Commonwealth of Nations, Barbadian diplomatic missions in the capitals of other Commonwealth members-states are known as High Commissions instead of embassies.

Excluded from this listing are honorary consulates, trade missions, and offices of the Barbados Tourism Authority.

History
In February 2020 the two Heads of Government for both Barbados and Trinidad and Tobago initialed several agreements including one which would see the sharing of various diplomatic chancery resources around the world.

Metaverse embassy

In November 2021, Barbados announced that it would launch the world's first embassy in the decentralised metaverse, an attempt to reach diplomatic parity.

Current missions

Africa

Americas

Asia

Europe

Multilateral organizations

Gallery

Closed missions

Americas

See also 
Foreign relations of Barbados
List of diplomatic missions in Barbados
List of Ambassadors and High Commissioners to and from Barbados
Visa policy of Barbados

References

External links 
 
 

 
Barbados
Diplomatic missions